Podymalovo is a rural locality (a village) in Dmitriyevsky Selsoviet, Ufimsky District, Bashkortostan, Russia. The population was 1,601 as of 2010. There are 35 streets.

Geography 
Podymalovo is located 24 km northwest of Ufa (the district's administrative centre) by road. Chernolesovsky is the nearest rural locality.

References 

Rural localities in Ufimsky District